Olov Arvid Andersson  (19 May 1919 – 20 September 2011) was a Swedish weightlifter who competed at two editions of the summer Olympic Games. At the 1948 Summer Olympics in London he finished 13th in a field of 23 competitors in the men's featherweight event and 12th among 24 participants in the lightweight division at the 1952 Summer Olympics in Helsinki. Born in Sunne, Sweden, he was a member of Kristinehamns ABK and won gold medals at the 1947 and 1949 editions of the European Weightlifting Championships in the feather and lightweight categories respectively. He captured an additional gold medal at the 1946 World Weightlifting Championships in the featherweight tournament and a bronze medal at the 1949 edition in the lightweight category. He was awarded the 1946 Svenska Dagbladet Gold Medal for his victory at the World Championships. He died on 20 September 2011 in Kristinehamn at the age of 92.

References

1919 births
2011 deaths
People from Sunne Municipality
Swedish male weightlifters
Olympic weightlifters of Sweden
Weightlifters at the 1948 Summer Olympics
Weightlifters at the 1952 Summer Olympics
European Weightlifting Championships medalists
World Weightlifting Championships medalists
Sportspeople from Värmland County
20th-century Swedish people